Eaglemont railway station is located on the Hurstbridge line in Victoria, Australia. It serves the north-eastern Melbourne suburb of Eaglemont, and opened on 1 May 1926.

History
Opening on 1 May 1926, Eaglemont station, like the suburb itself, was named after "Mount Eagle", a property that was acquired in 1838 by Thomas Walker, who went on to become a representative of the District of Port Phillip in the New South Wales Legislative Council between 1843-1845. Walker later sold the property to John Browne, father of author Rolf Boldrewood.

In 1949, the railway line between Ivanhoe and Heidelberg was duplicated. In 1979, the present station building on Platform 2 was provided.

Platforms and services
Eaglemont has two side platforms. It is served by Hurstbridge line trains.

Platform 1:
  all stations and limited express services to Flinders Street

Platform 2:
  all stations and limited express services to Macleod, Greensborough, Eltham and Hurstbridge

References

External links
 
 Melway map

Railway stations in Melbourne
Railway stations in Australia opened in 1926
Railway stations in the City of Banyule